Pie postulatio voluntatis is a papal bull issued on 15 February 1113 by Pope Paschal II, in which the Pope formally recognized the establishment of the Knights Hospitaller and confirmed its independence and sovereignty. Today, the document is preserved at the National Library of Malta in Valletta, Malta.

Background
The origins of the Knights Hospitaller go back to around 1048, when the Fatimid Caliph Al-Mustansir Billah gave permission to merchants from the Republic of Amalfi to build a hospital in Jerusalem. The community which ran the hospital became independent during the First Crusade in around 1099, under the leadership of Grand Master Blessed Gerard.

The bull

Pope Paschal II granted the bull to the Blessed Gerard on 15 February 1113. In it, the Pope formally recognized the foundation of the Hospital, which became a lay-religious order under the sole protection of the Church. The bull gave the Order the right to elect its Grand Masters without interference from external authorities. The knights of the Order were bound by three vows: poverty, chastity and obedience.

The bull formed the legal basis of the independence and sovereignty of the Order.

The document is preserved at the National Library of Malta in Valletta, Malta.

Commemorations
The 900th anniversary of the papal bull was commemorated by the Sovereign Military Order of Malta (SMOM) with a two-day International Conference in Rome, which was attended by around 5,000 people. The conference began on 7 February 2013, and it ended on 9 February with a mass held by Cardinal Tarcisio Bertone at St. Peter's Basilica. The branches of the SMOM around the world also commemorated the anniversary with a number of initiatives.

Poste Magistrali, the Order's postal service, issued a set of two stamps and Malta's postal authority MaltaPost issued a miniature sheet to commemorate the anniversary.

Full Text

See also
Omne datum optimum, a similar bull which gave Papal protection to the Knights Templar

References

External links
Text of the bull in English

12th-century papal bulls
Documents of Pope Paschal II
Knights Hospitaller
1113 in Europe
1113 works